Joseph Whitman House is a historic home located at West Hills in Suffolk County, New York. It was built about 1692 and is a -story, four-bay shingled residence with a -story two-bay south wing.  Also on the property is the site of a stone fort and an early-19th-century barn and shed.

It was added to the National Register of Historic Places in 1985.

References

Houses on the National Register of Historic Places in New York (state)
Houses completed in 1692
Houses in Suffolk County, New York
National Register of Historic Places in Suffolk County, New York
1692 establishments in the Province of New York